Ichneumon rubriornatus is a species of wasp in the genus Ichneumon. It was described by Peter Cameron in 1904.

The species is concentrated in the southernmost part of the African continent, being observed primarily in Southern Africa.

References

Insects described in 1904
Ichneumoninae